Rudolph George Perpich Sr. (June 27, 1928 September 21, 1995) was an American politician and the longest-serving governor of Minnesota, serving a total of just over 10 years. A member of the Democratic-Farmer-Labor Party, he served as the 34th and 36th Governor of Minnesota from December 29, 1976, to January 4, 1979, and again from January 3, 1983, to January 7, 1991. He was also the state's only Roman Catholic governor and the only one to serve non-consecutive terms. Before entering politics, he was a dentist.

Early life and education 
Rudolph George Prpić was born in Carson Lake, Minnesota, which is now part of Hibbing. His father, Anton Prpić, was a miner who had immigrated from Croatia to Minnesota's Mesabi Iron Range, and his mother, Mary (Vukelich), was an American of Croatian descent. Perpich did not learn to speak English until at least the first grade of elementary school. At 14, he began working for the Great Northern Railway. He graduated from Hibbing High School in 1946 and served two years in the United States Army. He then attended Marquette University in Milwaukee, Wisconsin, and graduated from Marquette University Dental School in 1954, whereupon he returned to Hibbing to practice dentistry.

Entry into politics 
Perpich first entered politics by serving on the Hibbing school board in 1955–56. The board gained notability for instituting equal pay for male and female workers. In 1962, he was elected to the Minnesota Senate, representing the old 63rd District, which included portions of Saint Louis County in the northeastern part of the state. He was reelected in 1966.

In 1970, Perpich was elected the 39th lieutenant governor of Minnesota. He was reelected in 1974 on a ticket with Governor Wendell R. Anderson. (Before 1974, the governor and lieutenant governor were elected separately in Minnesota.) He became governor when Anderson resigned in 1976 to accept appointment to the United States Senate seat vacated by Walter Mondale, who had been elected Vice President of the United States. Perpich was the first Iron Range resident to hold the office.

Gubernatorial campaigns
Nearly the entire DFL Party ticket was defeated in 1978; the defeated candidates included Perpich and the candidates for both U.S. Senate seats. Anderson's arrangement to have himself appointed to the Senate and Perpich's role in that appointment were deemed major factors in those defeats.

Perpich worked at Control Data Corporation in New York and Austria for several years. In 1982, he challenged the DFL Party's endorsed candidate for governor, Warren Spannaus, in the primary election, and won. He then defeated Independent-Republican nominee Wheelock Whitney in the general election. Perpich served as the Chairman of the Midwestern Governors Association in 1984.

Perpich was reelected in 1986, but lost to Arne Carlson in 1990, a bizarre campaign in which Carlson replaced the Independent-Republican Party's candidate Jon Grunseth, who had beaten Carlson in the primary. (After Carlson's surprise primary defeat, a bipartisan, grassroots group, Minnesotans for the WRITE Choice, launched a noisy, media-intensive campaign urging Carlson to re-challenge Grunseth.) Grunseth was forced to withdraw amid allegations of a sex scandal just two weeks before the election. Perpich was Minnesota's last DFL governor until Mark Dayton was elected in 2010.

Colorful behavior and international goals
Perpich had a reputation for colorful behavior. At one point while governor, he donated his $25,000 pay raise to help promote bocce. He also pitched an idea for a chopstick factory to be built in northern Minnesota, and proposed selling the governor's mansion in Saint Paul as a cost-saving measure.

Newsweek brought Perpich national attention by bestowing on him the nickname "Governor Goofy", crystallizing the combination of affection and resentment his habits elicited. During his last years in office, commentators wondered whether he would shoot to stardom as a presidential hopeful or, as governor, sour Minnesota voters on the DFL party with questionable public relations. But Perpich's activist vision of the governor's role was later cited as an important contribution to the Minnesota economy, even by such unlikely admirers as his 1990 rival and successor Arne Carlson, who said in 2005 that Perpich "was the first person that I was aware of to focus on the international role that states are going to have to play."

Perpich's legacy of projects in Minnesota include the Minnesota World Trade Center in Saint Paul, the Perpich Center for Arts Education in Golden Valley, the Center for Victims of Torture in Minneapolis, the University of Minnesota Duluth Natural Resources Research Institute, and the Mall of America in Bloomington. Additionally, he worked to promote Minnesota on the international stage by traveling to 17 countries in 1984, and bringing the foreign leaders Mikhail Gorbachev of the Soviet Union and Dr. Franjo Tuđman of Croatia to the state in 1990.

Perpich opposed the Reagan proxy war against Nicaragua in the 1980s and was one of several governors who objected to sending their National Guard units to train in U.S. bases in Honduras, where the U.S.-backed Contras were based. The Contras carried out atrocities in Nicaragua to topple the leftist government there. Perpich was the plaintiff in the 1990 U.S. Supreme Court case Perpich v. Department of Defense, which established that the U.S. Department of Defense could send state National Guard units overseas over the governor's objection.

Post-political life 
After leaving office in 1991, Perpich went to Zagreb, Croatia, to assist its post-communist government. In 1992 he moved to Paris, France, for a business consulting position. He returned to Minnesota in 1993. In 1995, at the age of 67, Perpich died of colon cancer in the Minneapolis suburb of Minnetonka. He is buried in Lakewood Cemetery in Minneapolis.

See also 
Perpich Center for Arts Education
Saint Louis County Road 4 – Governor Rudy Perpich Memorial Drive

References

 Rudy Perpich: Detailed chronological biography and reference site

External links 

In Memoriam Gov. Rudy Perpich (1928–1995)
Rudy Perpich Biography on croatianhistory.net
New York Times Obituary: September 22, 1995

 Rudy Perpich in MNopedia, the Minnesota Encyclopedia

1928 births
1995 deaths
American dentists
People from Hibbing, Minnesota
American people of Croatian descent
Deaths from cancer in Minnesota
Deaths from colorectal cancer
Democratic Party governors of Minnesota
Lieutenant Governors of Minnesota
Democratic Party Minnesota state senators
Marquette University alumni
Burials at Lakewood Cemetery
20th-century American politicians
Military personnel from Minnesota
Catholics from Minnesota
20th-century dentists